= Army Chemical Review =

- Language: English

Publication details
- Frequency: Biannual

Standard abbreviations
- ISO 4: Army Chem. Rev.

Indexing
- ISSN: 1556-4916

Army Chemical Review is prepared twice a year by the United States Army Chemical, Biological, Radiological, and Nuclear (CBRN) School and the Maneuver Support Center, Directorate of Training, Fort Leonard Wood, Missouri. This magazine presents professional information about the Army Chemical Corps functions related to CBRN, smoke, flame, and civil support operations. The objectives of this magazine are to inform, motivate, increase knowledge, improve performance, and provide a forum for the exchange of ideas .
